The 1982 Ohio gubernatorial election was held in Ohio on November 2, 1982. Dick Celeste of the Democratic Party was elected with 59% of the vote.

As of 2020, this is the last time Butler County and Holmes County voted for the Democratic candidate. Hamilton County would not vote Democratic in a gubernatorial contest again until 2018.

Democratic primary

Candidates
William J. Brown, Attorney General of Ohio
Dick Celeste, nominee for Governor in 1978 and former Director of the Peace Corps and Lieutenant Governor
Jerry Springer, former mayor of Cincinnati

Results

Republican primary

Candidates
Bud Brown, U.S. Representative from Urbana
Seth Taft, former Cuyahoga County Commissioner and son of Charles Phelps Taft II
Bob Teater, director of the Ohio Department of Natural Resources
Tom Van Meter, State Senator from Ashland

Results

General Election

References

1982
1982 Ohio elections
Ohio